OpenAtom Foundation, a non-profit independent legal entity registered with the Ministry of Civil Affairs, is the first foundation for the open-source software in China. It was established in June 2020 and initiated jointly by Alibaba, Baidu, Huawei, Inspur, Qihoo 360, Tencent, China Merchants Bank and other companies for operation and marketing services of open source projects.

Projects 
As of December 2022, the foundation hosts open source projects including xupercore, OpenHarmony, openEuler, TecentOS Tiny, AliOS Things, OpenBlock, PIKA and hapjs.

Collaboration 
On September 28, 2021, the OpenAtom Foundation and the Eclipse Foundation announced their intention to form a partnership to collaborate on OpenHarmony.

On October 26 in the same year, both partners launched Oniro operation system, a compatible implementation of OpenHarmony based on open source and aimed to be transparent, vendor-neutral, and independent system for the global market with the founding members including Huawei, Linaro and Seco, an Italian IoT device manufacturer.

See also 
OpenHarmony

References

External links 

 

Foundations based in China
Organizations established in 2020